USS LST-520 was a  in the United States Navy during World War II. She was transferred to the Republic of China Navy as ROCS Chung Shu (LST-228).

Construction and career 
LST-520 was laid down on 24 September 1943 at Missouri Valley Bridge and Iron Company, Evansville, Indiana. Launched on 31 January 1944 and commissioned on 28 February 1944.

Service in the United States Navy 
During World War II, LST-503 was assigned to the Europe-Africa-Middle theater but later changed  Asiatic-Pacific theater. She then participated in the Invasion of Normandy from 6 to 25 June 1944.

She participated in the invasion of Okinawa and later took occupation there from 16 May to 30 June 1945. She assigned to Occupation service in the Far East from Occupation 20 September to 3 October 1945, 17 to 28 October 1945, 14 November to 22 December 1945 and 3 to 13 January 1946.

She was decommissioned on 13 January 1946 and came under the Commander Naval Forces Far East (COMNAVFE) Shipping Control Authority for Japan (SCAJAP), redesignated Q013.

Transferred to the Military Sea Transportation Service (MSTS), 31 March 1952, and placed in service as USNS T-LST-520.

LST-520 was struck from the Navy Register on 1 October 1958 and transferred to the Republic of China.

Service in the Republic of China Navy 
She was commissioned into the Republic of China Navy on 16 September 1958 and renamed ROCS Chung Shu (LST-228) and was subordinate to the Deng Er Fleet Department (136 Fleet Department).

In January 1959, weapons were installed at the Hai No. 1 Plant, and in January 1967, the Xinzhong No. 1 modernization was implemented at the Keelung Taiwan Shipyard and the refit was carried out.

During the naval service period, the ship performed out-of-island transportation, supplementary training, and exercise training. It was able to display mutual assistance, cooperation, and the spirit of unity and struggle, and it was successfully completed.

Due to the gradual decrease in transportation and replenishment tasks, a simple seal was ordered on 16 December 1990.

Awards 
LST-520 have earned the following awards:

American Campaign Medal
European-Africa-Middle East Campaign Medal (1 battle star)
Asiatic-Pacific Campaign Medal (1 battle star)
Navy Occupation Medal (with Asia clasp)
World War II Victory Medal

Citations

Sources 
 
 
 
 

LST-491-class tank landing ships
Ships built in Seneca, Illinois
World War II amphibious warfare vessels of the United States
LST-491-class tank landing ships of the Republic of China Navy
1944 ships